Eden Arthur Shand (14 September 1939 – 20 January 2021) was a Trinidadian environmentalist and politician.  He worked toward establishing environmental standards in Trinidad and Tobago.  

Shand served as an MP for St. Ann's West (1987–1991) under the National Alliance for Reconstruction.  He was a Parliamentary Secretary in the Ministry of Food Production, Marine Exploitation, Forestry and the Environment (1987–1988) and the Minister of External Affairs and International Trade (1988–1991).

Early life 
Shand was born on 14 September 1939.  He received a BSc (Hons) in Forestry from the University of Aberdeen in 1963, and an MBA from the University of British Columbia in 1968.

Shand worked in the Trinidadian government Division of Forestry from 1963 to 1965.  After finishing his MBA, he worked as a forest economist in Vancouver from 1968 to 1972, then returned to Trinidad.  In 1979, Shand was one of the founding members of Citizens For Conservation.

In the 1980s, Shand hosted a youth-focused talk show called Feedback on Trinidad and Tobago Television.

Politics 
In 1986, Shand won the St. Ann's West seat in the House of Representatives as a candidate of the National Alliance for Reconstruction (NAR) party, defeating the incumbent candidate of the People's National Movement (PNM).  The newly-founded NAR became the first opposition party to win a national parliamentary election since independence in 1962.

Shand was sworn in on 12 January 1987.  He was initially appointed a Parliamentary Secretary in the Ministry of Food Production, Marine Exploitation, Forestry and the Environment.  However, he was removed from this portfolio in 1988 after proposing restrictions on deliberate forest burning.  He then became the Minister of External Affairs and International Trade. Together with Sylvia Kacal and other conservationists, he founded the Caribbean Forest Conservation Association (CFCA) in 1988.

Shand was one of the MPs held hostage during the Jamaat al Muslimeen coup attempt in 1990.

St. Ann's West was merged with Port of Spain North for the 1991 elections.  Shand did not stand for reelection.

Later activism 
After leaving Parliament, Shand gained certification as an Associate Environmental Auditor from the Environmental Auditors Registration Association (UK).  He set up a consultancy, Environmental Management and Planning Associates Limited.  Shand also became the chairman of the Caribbean Forest Conservation Association; during his tenure, the organisation began setting up conservation parks.

Shand campaigned against projects to build over the Queen's Park Savannah.  During a 1999 sit-in, builders attempting to pave over a section of the park dumped a truckload of gravel on Shand.  He was excavated alive, but had lasting injuries.  He opposed a 2006 government proposal to build a stadium at the park, and exposed other cases where construction projects had been approved without securing environmental assessments. 

Shand wrote articles in the Trinidad Express and the Trinidad Guardian where he critiqued the governance structure of the state Environment Management Agency.  He was chairman of Trinidad and Tobago's Earth Charter National Committee.

Personal life 
Shand had five children.  His two younger children were from his marriage to Mary Schorse, an American social scientist.  Shand and Schorse co-founded the Tropical Re-Leaf Foundation.

Death 
Shand died on 20 January 2021 at the age of 81 after a long illness.  The House of Representatives paid tribute to Shand at the beginning of the 27 January session.

Electoral history

Partial bibliography

Books 
 The Development of the Japanese Market for Pacific Northwest Lumber (1968, thesis) 
The Estates Within: A Docu-Drama (1992)

Articles 
"Global Warming and the Caribbean" in Caribbean Beat (1992) 
"Rehabilitating Our Forests" (2009)

References 

1939 births
2021 deaths
Alumni of the University of Aberdeen
Conservationists
Environmental writers
Government ministers of Trinidad and Tobago
Members of the House of Representatives (Trinidad and Tobago)
National Alliance for Reconstruction politicians
Trinidad and Tobago columnists
Trinidad and Tobago environmentalists
UBC Sauder School of Business alumni